Abdolhossein Behnia, also Latinized as Abdul Husain Behnia, was an Iranian politician who served as minister of finance several times during the reign of Shah Mohammad Reza Pahlavi. He served in the cabinet of Prime Minister Ali Amini and then of Asadollah Alam in the early 1960s.

Behnia was appointed minister of finance to the cabinet of Ali Amini on 9 May 1961. He resigned from office on 9 January 1962 due to the approval of a land reform bill by the cabinet. Behnia argued that the bill was not required. He was also appointed minister of finance to the cabinet led by Asadollah Alam on 19 February 1963.

References

20th-century Iranian politicians
Finance ministers of Iran
Year of birth missing
Year of death missing
Independent politicians